Oklahoma Wildlife Management Areas are protected conservation areas within the U. S. state of Oklahoma.

Further reading
List of Wetland Development Units (WDUs)

References

Protected areas of Oklahoma
National Grasslands of the United States